Brigadier Zaka Ullah Bhangoo (1948–2007) was a Pakistan Army aviator and one-star general who, after his retirement, became involved in flying microlight aircraft. He was killed in a light plane crash in Turkey in May 2007 while attempting a flight from the United Kingdom to Pakistan.

Early life and army career

Bhangoo was born in 1948 in Sheikhupura, Pakistan, educated at Lawrence College Ghora Gali, and commissioned into the Pakistan Army in 1968. He flew helicopters such as the Alouette and Puma, and fixed-wing aircraft such as the O-1 Bird Dog. He also flew helicopters for the Pakistan Army Aviation's VVIP flight for 8 years.

In 2001, he and a co-pilot (Brigadier General Ajab Khan) planned to fly an ultralight aircraft around the world in 80 days. The flight did not ultimately take place due to logistical and diplomatic difficulties.

Flight incident and death 

In 2007, he was piloting a light plane with an English friend, Mick Newman, on a flight from the United Kingdom to Pakistan. After the crash, The Daily Telegraph reported that Osman Güneş, the Turkish interior minister, claimed that the pair were being trailed by the MİT, Turkey's intelligence organization.

References

Pakistan Army Aviation Corps officers
1948 births
2007 deaths
Pakistani test pilots
Pilots of the Indo-Pakistani War of 1971